Ekaterina Mironova may refer to:

 Ekaterina Mironova (gymnast) (born 1982), Belarusian trampolinist
 Yekaterina Mironova (born 1977), Russian skeleton racer